Petro Petrovych Dyminskyi (born 27 November 1954) is a Ukrainian politician, businessman and former footballer for FC Kryvbas Kryvyi Rih.

Biography
In the 1990s, Dyminskyi worked as a director of selected mines in the Western Ukraine. He owns or co-owns the Ukrainian football team FC Karpaty Lviv, WOG, ZIK, and Halychyna Oil Refinery.

He was a member of the Verkhovna Rada from 2002 to 2006. He was elected on the list (as non-partisan) of Our Ukraine but later switched to the faction of Party of Regions.

Along with some other MPs (Ihor Yeremeyev, Stepan Ivakhiv and Serhiy Lahur), in December 2012 he founded the fuel-industrial group Kontinium.

Dyminskyi is suspected of committing a fatal car accident, which resulted in the death of 31-year-old Natalia Trila on 18 August 2017. Since 22 August 2017 Dyminskyi is in an unknown location outside Ukraine.

References

1954 births
Association footballers not categorized by position
FC Kryvbas Kryvyi Rih players
FC Karpaty Lviv
Fugitives wanted by Ukraine
Independent politicians in Ukraine
Living people
Politicians from Kryvyi Rih
Ukrainian football chairmen and investors
Kryvyi Rih National University, General Faculty alumni
Fourth convocation members of the Verkhovna Rada
Soviet footballers
Our Ukraine (political party) politicians
Party of Regions politicians
Ukrainian exiles
Businesspeople from Kryvyi Rih
Businesspeople in mining
Businesspeople in energy